Selje is a former municipality in the Vestlandet, Norway, that now forms part of Stad Municipality.

Selje may also refer to:

Places
Selje (village), a village in Stad municipality, Sogn og Fjordane, Norway
Selje Church, a church in Stad municipality, Sogn og Fjordane, Norway
Selje Abbey, a former Benedictine monastery located on the island of Selja in Stad municipality, Norway

Other
SS Selje (1920), a former Norwegian cargo vessel
, a Norwegian ferry

See also
Selja (disambiguation)